Anastasia Vykhodtseva (Анастасія Виходцева, born 20 May 1991 in Dnepropetrovsk) is Polish-Ukrainian former figure skater who used to start in ice dance category.

At first she started for Ukraine (with Alexei Shumski and Artem Farin), but then changed the country for Poland and skated with Jan Mościcki. Having given up the competitive skating, she became a coach and choreographer in Toruń, Poland. Among her skaters and former skaters are Natalia Kaliszek and Maksym Spodyriev, Agnieszka Rejment and Aleksandra Rudolf.

Competitive highlights

with Mościcki, for Poland

with Shumski, for Ukraine

with Farin, for Ukraine

References

External links 
 
 

Polish female ice dancers
Ukrainian female ice dancers
Figure skating choreographers
Women choreographers
Polish choreographers
Ukrainian choreographers
Figure skating coaches
Polish figure skating coaches
Ukrainian figure skating coaches
1991 births
Living people
Sportspeople from Dnipro
Sportspeople from Toruń